Carl Axel Sjöberg (born 14 April 2000) is a Swedish footballer who plays as a right back for League of Ireland Premier Division club St Patrick's Athletic.

Early life
Sjöberg was born in Helsingborg, Sweden, and started to play football as a youngster with local club Eskilsminne IF before moving to Helsingborgs IF in 2013. He was part of their youth academy for seven years, but left the club in 2019 after not being offered a professional contract.

Club career

IK Frej
On 19 July 2019, Sjöberg joined IK Frej in Superettan, on a one and half-year contract. He only made one league appearance during the second half of the season, as the club got relegated from Sweden's second division. 

In 2020, Sjöberg made 26 league appearances and captained IK Frej as the club finished 9th in Division 1, the third tier.

Hammarby IF
On 5 August 2020, Sjöberg signed a one and a half-year contract with Hammarby IF, although still being eligible to play for affiliated club IK Frej. He made his Allsvenskan debut on 30 August in a 3–3 home draw against Kalmar FF.

On 30 May 2021, Sjöberg won the 2020–21 Svenska Cupen, the main domestic cup, with Hammarby IF, through a 5–4 win on penalties (0–0 after full-time) against BK Häcken in the final.

On 4 August 2021, Sjöberg was sent out on loan to IK Brage in Superettan for the remainder of the year. At the end of the year, it was announced that Sjöberg would leave Hammarby IF at the expiration of his contract.

BK Olympic
Sjöberg spent 2022 at BK Olympic, scoring 2 goals in 25 appearances in all competitions during his time with the club.

St Patrick's Athletic
On 3 March 2023, Sjöberg signed for League of Ireland Premier Division club St Patrick's Athletic.

Personal life
His twin brother Filip Sjöberg is also a professional footballer.

Career statistics

Club

Honours

Club
Hammarby IF
 Svenska Cupen: 2020–21

References

External links

2000 births
Living people
Sportspeople from Helsingborg
Association football defenders
Swedish footballers
IK Frej players
Hammarby Fotboll players
Hammarby Talang FF players
IK Brage players
Allsvenskan players
Superettan players
Ettan Fotboll players
St Patrick's Athletic F.C. players
League of Ireland players
Expatriate association footballers in the Republic of Ireland